Sovicille is a comune (municipality) in the Province of Siena in the Italian region Tuscany, located about  south of Florence and about  southwest of Siena.

Sovicille borders the comuni of Casole d'Elsa, Chiusdino, Monteriggioni, Monteroni d'Arbia, Monticiano, Murlo, Siena.

History 
The name Sovicille is documented as far back as 1004, but the origins of the place probably go back much further.   (In 2002 a mosaic from the Roman period was uncovered in the Church of St John the Baptist, and there are several Etruscan relics in the immediate area.)

During the Middle Ages the region found itself on the borders between Siena and Volterra.  The Abbey of Serena, some 30 kilometers to the west, was under the control of Volterra, and the land around Sovicille was included as property of the abbey around the year 1000.

A written record of the place survives from 23 April 1123, in which the (by origin Senese) Pope Alexander III identifies it as Sufficille.   The name is thought to derive from the Latin words "sub" (under) and "ficinulae/ficus" (small fig tree").

The municipal statutes date right back to the 13th century.   The  democratically administered Republic of Siena allowed several municipalities, including Sovicille, their own municipal statutes in 1238 (modified in 1293 and then reconfigured, to the format that survives today, in 1303), which included the right to make their own laws.

In 1260 Sovicille was occupied by Florence, but in that year the Florentine armies were defeated at the Battle of Montaperti, whereupon Sovicille reverted to Siena.

In 1333 Sovicille was overrun and burned down by Pisa.

The Medici family purchased the lands of Siena from the Emperor for two million ducats in 1557:  this was followed by the abolition of democratic institutions and a return to feudalism.   Sovicille became a fief of the Medici and was transformed into an imposing fortress, defending an access point to their newly expanded territories.

After the death of the last of the Medici rulers, power transferred to the Dukes of Lorraine, who remained in control till the end of the 18th century when the entire region was invaded by the French armies of Napoleon Bonaparte.

The French remained in charge till 1814 when, under the terms agreed at Vienna, Sovicille was annexed to the Grand Duchy of Tuscany.   In 1859 it came under the control of the short-lived United Provinces of Central Italy, which was effectively a transitional entity leading to incorporation in 1861 within the new Kingdom of Italy.

Frazioni
The municipality is formed by the municipal seat of Sovicille and the towns and villages (frazioni) of Ancaiano, Brenna, Rosia, San Rocco a Pilli, Tegoia, Torri and Volte Basse. Other notable villages include Ampugnano, Arnano, Barontoli, Brucciano, Caggio di Mezzo, Caldana, Carpineto, Castello, Celsa, Cerreto Selva, Costa, Cuove, Malignano, Palazzaccio, Palazzavelli, Pian dei Mori, Piscialembita, Poggio, Poggio Salvi, Ponte allo Spino, Recenza, San Giusto a Balli, San Salvatore a Pilli, Segalaie, Simignano, Stigliano, Solatio di Sotto, Toiano, Tonni, Valacchio and Valli.

References